Wey Valley Meadows is a  biological Site of Special Scientific Interest north of Godalming in Surrey.

Much of it is maintained by rabbit grazing, but there are also areas of wet fen-meadow, woodland and scrub. Snipe, lapwing and kingfisher breed on the site.

References

Sites of Special Scientific Interest in Surrey